Delectable is the second album by AOR band Romeo's Daughter. It was released on 30 September 1993 by Music for Nations. The band co-produced the album with Andy Reilly.

"Attracted to the Animal" was released as the album's only single. Romeo's Daughter broke up shortly after Delectable was released. They reformed in 2009 after Rock Candy reissued Delectable and their debut album.

Background 
Romeo's Daughter recorded their debut album with producers Mutt Lange and John Parr under Jive Records. Romeo's Daughter was not a commercial success, but received critical acclaim and some of the tracks went on to be covered by established artists. The band delayed working on their second album as they hoped to work with Lange again, but he was busy collaborating with Bryan Adams on his album Waking Up the Neighbours. Romeo's Daughter subsequently left Jive for Music for Nations and self-produced Delectable with Andy Reilly.

Release and promotion 
"Attracted to the Animal" was released as the album's only single, featuring two bonus tracks "Sugar Daddy" and "Talk Dirty to Me". Delectable was released on 30 September 1993.

Critical reception 

Steve Beebee of Kerrang! described Delectable as a "well executed" album that "betters [its predecessor] in every possible way".

Track listing

Credits and personnel
Adapted from album liner notes.

Musicians
 Romeo's Daughter – production
 Andy Reilly – production
 Leigh Matty – lead vocals
 Craig Joiner – guitars, backing vocals
 Tony Mitman – keys
 Andy Wells – drums, backing vocals
 Mark Goldsworthy – bass

Technical
 Steve Brown – mixing
 Owen Davies – mixing
 Steve Musters – assistant mixing
 Jon Wilkinson – assistant mixing
 Gordon Vicary – mastering

Design
 Peter Mountain – photography
 Mez Meredith – concept and design

References 

1993 albums
Romeo's Daughter albums
Music for Nations albums